Daniel "Danny" Amos (born 2 February 1987) is an Israeli professional footballer who plays as a goalkeeper for Maccabi Petah Tikva.

Early life
He immigrated as a baby to Israel from South Africa, with his English father and his Zimbabwean-born mother. He was raised in kibbutz Kfar Blum.

His older brother Nathan Amos is a notable Israeli rugby union player.

International career 
Amos' sole call-up was to the Israel under-21 national team for a friendly against Belarus at Winter Stadium in Ramat Gan on 20 August 2008.

Amos was first called to the senior Israel national team to a friendly versus Ukraine on 22 February 2012. He also remained in several preliminary senior squads during 2012 and 2013, without gaining a full cap.

Honours

Club
Ironi Kiryat Shmona
 Liga Leumit: 2006/07
 Toto Cup Leumit: 2006/07, 2009
Israeli Premier League: 2011–12

Individual
IFA Footballer of the Year: 2012

Career statistics 
 As to 1 June 2022

References

1987 births
Living people
People from Vanderbijlpark
South African emigrants to Israel
Israeli footballers
Association football goalkeepers
Hapoel Ironi Kiryat Shmona F.C. players
Hapoel Tel Aviv F.C. players
Hapoel Acre F.C. players
Maccabi Petah Tikva F.C. players
Maccabi Netanya F.C. players
Israeli Premier League players
Liga Leumit players
Israeli people of South African-Jewish descent
Israeli people of English-Jewish descent
Israeli people of Zimbabwean descent
Footballers from Kfar Blum
Sportspeople from Gauteng